Argema besanti, the Equinox moth, is a very rare moth in the family Saturniidae. It is found in Tanzania and Kenya.

It has an approximate length of 9 centimeters and wingspan of 11 centimeters. Its wings are coloured green, while the upper wings are darker. It has a little red "eye" on each wing. The adult moth cannot eat and lives for 4–6 days.

References

Besanti
Moths described in 1895
Moths of Africa